Cowichan Tribes is the band government of the Cowichan, a group of Coast Salish peoples who live in the Cowichan Valley region on Vancouver Island. With over 3,800 registered members, it is the single largest First Nations band in British Columbia.

When the band was created pursuant to the Indian Act, seven nearby peoples were amalgamated into one "band."  The Quamichan/Kw'amutsun are the largest cultural group, but the nation also includes  Clemclemaluts (L'uml'umuluts), Comiaken (Qwum'yiqun'), Khenipsen (Hinupsum), Kilpahlas (Tl'ulpalus), Koksilah (Hwulqwselu), and Somena (S'amuna').

Tribal area 

The traditional territory of the Cowichan people covered the entire Cowichan Valley, the surrounding area around Cowichan Lake, Shawnigan Lake, and extended into the Gulf Islands and the Fraser River. The lower reaches of the Cowichan Valley, particularly the area stretching from the present location of Duncan down to Cowichan Bay (and including the lower Koksilah River), was the most heavily settled.

Today, the total reserve area is currently 24 square kilometres (5,900 acres), made up of nine Reserves, with Core Traditional Territory is approximately 1,750 square kilometres (100,000 acres). The tribe comprises seven traditional villages .
(Kw'amutsun, Qwum'yiqun', Hwulqwselu, S'amuna', L'uml'umuluts, Hinupsum, Tl'ulpalus)
 Quamichan
 Comiaken 
 Koksilah 
 Somena 
 Clemclemluts
 Khenipsen 
 Cowichan Bay

Reserves

Indian Reserves under the administration of the Cowichan Tribes are: 
Cowichan 1, Cowichan District, 8 Parcels Of Land, Quamichan District Another 8 Parcels Of Land, 2292.70 ha. 
Theik 2, Cowichan District, On South Shore Of Cowichan Bay, East Coast Of Vancouver Island, 30.3 ha. 
Kil-pah-las 3, Cowichan District Sec 6 Rge 5, On South Shore Of Cowichan Bay East Coast Of Vancouver Island, 20.6 ha. 
Est-Patrolas 4, Shawinagan District, Sec 19, Range 5, 2 Miles South Of Cowichan Bay, 27.8 ha. 
Tzart-lam 5, Sahtlam District, Part Of Sec 6, Rge 6, On Left Bank Of Cowichan River, Vancouver Island, 6.5 ha. 
Kakalatza 6, Shatlam District, Part Of Sec 7 & 8 Rge 2 On Left Bank Of Cowichan River, 8.0 ha. 
Skutz 7, Cowichan Lake District, On Left Bank Of Cowichan River At Skutz Canyon, 7.3 ha. 
Skutz 8, Cowichan Lake District On The Cowichan River, At Head Of Skutz Canyon, 14.9 ha. 
Cowichan 9, Cowichan District, West 1/2 Of Sec 11 Rge 2, Near Mouth Of Koksilak River At Head Of Cowichan Bay, 17.9 ha.

Governance 
Cowichan Tribes is governed by an elected band council consisting of a chief and 12 councilors, within the framework of the Indian Act.  It is part of the Hul'qumi'num Treaty Group which is currently at Stage 4 (Agreement in Principle) of the British Columbia Treaty Process.

The band is responsible for providing social programmes for children and families, education, health, housing, and social development.

Tribal-owned businesses 
Cowichan Tribes currently owns and operates Khowutzun Development Corporation (KDC) group of companies, which includes the following subsidiaries with a combined 2004 revenue of $60 million:
 Khowutzun Mustimuhw Contractors Limited Partnership (KMCLP)
 Khowutzun Forest Services Limited Partnership (KFCLP)
 Khowutzun Millwork & Joinery Limited Partnership (KMJLP)
 Quw'utsun Cultural and Conference Centre (QCCC)

Cowichan Tribes are also known for a distinctive type of knitting, most especially Cowichan sweaters.

See also
Hul’qumi’num’
Quamichan
Quw'utsun
Somena

References

External links 
 Cowichan Tribes Website
 First Nations Detail: Cowichan, Profile by Aboriginal Affairs and Northern Development Canada
 Hul’qumi’num Treaty Group
 Khowutzun Development Corporation

Coast Salish governments
Duncan, British Columbia
Mid Vancouver Island